Plymouth State University (PSU), formerly Plymouth State College, is a public university in the towns of Plymouth and Holderness, New Hampshire. As of fall 2020, Plymouth State University enrolls 4,491 students (3,739 undergraduate students and 752 graduate students). The school was founded as Plymouth Normal School in 1871. Since that time, it has evolved to a teachers college, a state college, and finally to a state university in 2003. PSU is part of the University System of New Hampshire.

Academics

The university offers BA, BFA, BS, MA, MAT, MBA, MS, and MEd degrees, the Certificate of Advanced Graduate Studies (CAGS), and the Doctor of Education (EdD) in Learning, Leadership, and Community. Plymouth State is accredited by the New England Association of Schools and Colleges, the New Hampshire Postsecondary Education Commission, and the National Council for Accreditation of Teacher Education (NCATE). Program-specific accreditations include the Accreditation Council for Business Schools and Programs (ACBSP) for undergraduate and graduate degrees; the Commission on Accreditation of Athletic Training Education (CAATE) for athletic training; the Council on Social Work Education (CSWE) for social work; the Society of Public Health Education and the American Association of Health Education (SOPHE/AAHE) for health education; and the Council for Accreditation of Counseling and Related Educational Programs (CACREP) for the Master of Education in Counselor Education, including mental health counseling and school counseling concentrations.

The university currently has 19 academic departments. Within each department there are several different study options and degree programs. The most popular majors at Plymouth State are business and education. Other popular majors include physical education, health education, art, social science, psychology, and communication studies. In 2011, Plymouth State University added a BS in nursing degree to its list of available programs of study.

Beginning in fall of 2017, the university switched to a "cluster model" with seven interdisciplinary areas instead of academic departments or colleges. The clusters are:
 Arts and technology
 Education, democracy and social change
 Exploration and discovery
 Health and human enrichment
 Innovation and entrepreneurship
 Justice and security
 Tourism, environment and sustainable development

The cluster approach is designed to encourage collaboration and communication in the application of solving problems and innovating for the digital age. The cluster model is championed by university president Donald Birx who was hired in 2015 after creating cluster models at other colleges and universities at which he previously worked.

Facilities 
Rounds Hall

Rounds Hall, with its iconic clock tower, was built in 1890 and named for Principal Charles Collins Rounds, who, as enrollment grew, strongly advocated for construction of a new classroom building. Today, Rounds Hall houses the university's education departments, which prepare tomorrow's leaders in early childhood, elementary, secondary, and special education, and social science department, which encompasses a wide variety of disciplines, including anthropology, political science, environmental planning and geography, and tourism management and policy. An annual tradition called Pumpkins on Rounds has been ongoing since 1975. Every fall pumpkins appear on the two spires atop the clock tower.

Samuel Read Hall Building
In spring 1923, Plymouth Normal School opened Samuel Read Hall Dormitory, named after an innovative teacher educator who taught at Holmes Plymouth Academy in the late 1830s. The facility is now focused on human and environmental health and housing the departments of Counselor Education and School Psychology, Nursing, Social Work and Physical Therapy (DPT).

Harold E. Hyde Hall
Built in 1974, Hyde Hall is named for Plymouth State's 10th president, Harold E. Hyde, whose 26-year tenure—from 1951 to 1977—was a period of growth for the institution in both number of students and in campus facilities. Today, Hyde Hall is home to academic programs, including the College of Business Administration and the Departments of Criminal Justice, Languages and Linguistics, Mathematics, and Psychology.

Boyd Science Center
Boyd Science Center is the heart of scientific research and study at PSU. The building, named for longtime science professor Robert L. Boyd. Boyd is also home to the Mark Sylvestre Planetarium and the Judd Gregg Meteorology Institute, a resource for students in PSU's undergraduate and graduate meteorology degree programs, the only such programs in New Hampshire. Data accessible from vortex.plymouth.edu (PSU Weather Center) is accessed over 500,000 times each week!

The Enterprise Center at Plymouth (ECP) opened in 2013 as a collaboration between the university and the Grafton County Economic Development Council. The ECP serves as a business incubator and accelerator, assisting start-ups and existing businesses with professional services and resources, including PSU student interns, who are regularly recruited to work with local businesses. Located on the banks of the Pemigewasset River at the point where the two sides of campus meet, the ECP represents the strong bond Plymouth State has formed with the community.

Mary Lyon Hall
Built in 1916 and renovated in 2006, it is named after Mary Lyon (1797–1849), an American pioneer in women's education. In 2012, Mary Lyon Hall was added to the New Hampshire State Register of Historic Places. Mary Lyon is home to PSU's international programs as well as the Center for Student Success, which offers academic support programs, undergraduate advising, global education resources, and career services.

Hartman Union Building
The center of student life on campus, known as the HUB, is a multi-function building. The HUB is home to student-run and professional offices. The HUB is also home to the Daily Paws Cafe and the Union Grille. Some of the offices inside are: The Office of Community Impact, 91.7 WPCR-FM, Student Support Foundation, Office of Student Life, New Student Experience Office, the Enterprise Technology & Services Help Desk (ETS) and more. Another PSU annual tradition called First Fire is held in the HUB Fireplace Lounge each fall and students come out to collect their unique First Fire Mug. 

Silver Center for the Arts
Built in 1956 and named for longtime Plymouth State president Ernest Silver, Silver Hall served as a physical education center, a music and theater teaching and performance facility, and an assembly hall. The Silver Center for the Arts supports PSU students of the performing arts.

The Silver Center is also the home of the New Hampshire Music Festival, which performs classical and pops concerts in the Hanaway Theater and chamber music concerts in Smith Recital Hall. The festival begins the week after the July 4th holiday and runs through the middle of August.

Draper and Maynard Building (D&M)
In the early twentieth century, the Draper & Maynard Building was home to premier sporting goods manufacturer Draper & Maynard Sporting Goods Company. It is home to PSU's Department of Health and Human Performance, which is focused on health, wellness, adventure education, and athletic training professionals. The first floor of the building houses the university's MakerSpace. The fourth floor is currently under construction and will soon feature several labs for the university's program in Electromechanic Technology and Robotics (EMTR), spearheaded by Dr. Martin D. Hellwig. Many MLB players received their equipment from D&M such as Babe Ruth.

Lamson Library and Learning Commons
Lamson Library and Learning Commons opened in September 2006. It is the largest publicly accessible library in central/northern New Hampshire, second-largest overall after Dartmouth College. The Learning Commons at Lamson Library is a state-of-the art, integrated research and technology center that provides PSU students, faculty and staff with access to a wide variety of research tools and materials, information technology resources and academic support services. Resources include open technology labs, the Spinelli Archives and Special Collections, and the Writing Center.

Residential halls and apartment buildings 
Most first-year students will reside in double or triple rooms in one of the university's traditional residence halls: Belknap, Geneva Smith, Grafton, Mary Lyon, and Pemigewasset. Newly admitted Upper Division students and graduate students are eligible to request housing in the White Mountain Apartments, Langdon Woods, and Merrill Place. Most notably, Langdon Woods was the first college dormitory building in New Hampshire to receive LEED Gold accrediation and is one of the more energy efficient dorms in the country.  

 Belknap Hall
 Geneva Smith Hall
 Grafton Hall
 Langdon Woods
 Mary Lyon Hall
 Merrill Place
 Non-Traditional Student Apartments
 Pemigewasset Hall
 White Mountain Apartments

Athletics

Plymouth State University's athletic teams are known as the Panthers. The athletic teams' colors are green and white. PSU competes in NCAA Division III as a member of the Little East Conference (LEC) for most of its intercollegiate sports. They've been successful in men's and women's skiing, ice hockey, football, basketball, and soccer, and women's field hockey, swimming and diving, and volleyball. The school's main rival is Keene State College, which also competes in the LEC. Every year the President's Cup is awarded to the school which has more victories in total sports competitions against each other.

Plymouth State University athletics mostly take place in the Physical Education (PE) Center which was opened in the Spring of 1969. Since that time it has undergone several expansions and renovations, and plans are now being developed to build a new, larger facility.

Plymouth State gained national attention in 1985 when Sports Illustrated featured PSU student and football player Joe Dudek as their favorite to win the Heisman Trophy. Dudek, a running back for the Panthers, earned the attention for breaking Walter Payton's mark for career touchdowns.

Three men in Plymouth State College history to have their numbers retired, Joe Dudek in football, Steve Clark in men's soccer, and Moses Jean-Pierre's basketball accomplishments were incomparable. He was recognized across the nation, earning First Team All-America honors in 1994 as well New England Player of the Year. He is the all-time leading scorer not only at Plymouth State, but in the history of college basketball in the state of New Hampshire, with 2, 483 points. He also holds NCAA record for steals in a Season 189 and steals in a Career average 5.5 & Season average 6.3.

The 1993 women's varsity tennis team claimed the Little East Conference championship and during the NEWITT (New England Women's Intercollegiate Tennis Tournament), the number 1 doubles combo of Laura Comi and Shea Hansen reached the semi-finals. Plymouth State Panther award winner Laura Comi (number 1 singles player from 1990 to 1993) holds the record of most wins in Plymouth women's tennis history with a season of 10–1. Comi was coached by Dave Webster.

In November 2008, the Plymouth women's volleyball team upset Colby-Sawyer College to claim the 2008 ECAC Division III New England Volleyball championship. Also in 2008, the self-coached men's rugby club won the Division III national championship, defeating Furman University in the final.

Athletic facilities
Charles L. Currier Memorial Field (football, men's lacrosse)
Panther Field (state of the art turf field for football)
AllWell North (home to the state's largest indoor track, and high tech classrooms)
Human Performance Center (HPC) (Home of Athletes only gym, rock climbing wall, indoor pool and classrooms)
AllWell South (home to Joan and Eugene Savage Welcome Center and ice hockey rink/arena)
Arold Field (soccer)

Museum of the White Mountains
The Museum of the White Mountains showcases artifacts and art from the White Mountains region and supports the university's teaching and research missions. Among the collections acquired by the museum are:
 Archives and images, including rare glass-plate photographs, stereoscopic images, hotel ledgers, postcards and more donated by the late Dan Noel.
 A comprehensive collection early and first edition as well as more recent books and guides about the region from John W. (Jack) and Anne H. Newton.
 White Mountains art by women artists from Frances "Dolly" MacIntyre.
 Images and collectables from the Balsams Grand Resort Hotel from Steve Barba.

Notable people

Alumni
Robin Alexis (b. 1955), radio and television personality
Ed Ashnault (b. 1934), collegiate baseball, basketball and football coach (1960)
Don Brown (b. 1955), Defensive Coordinator, University of Michigan (1996 M.Ed.)
Joe Dudek (b. 1964), All-American collegiate football player, Heisman trophy finalist & former Denver Broncos player
Sanna Ejaz, Pashtun women's rights activist
Ella Knowles Haskell (1860–1911), first woman to argue a case in the U.S. Supreme Court (attended for one year)
Jeffrey R. Howard (b. 1955), U.S. Courts of Appeals judge (1978)
Bill Morrissey (1951–2011), American folk singer, attended that year but did not graduate (1971)
Chuck Morse (b. 1960), President of the New Hampshire Senate (2013-2018, 2020–present)
Ethan Paquin, B.A., American poet
Paul Reubens (b. 1952), actor known for his character Pee Wee Herman (did not graduate)
Chris Romano (b. 1978), television producer, co-creator of Blue Mountain State 
Jack Storms (b. 1970), glass sculptor
Matt Tupman (b. 1979), Major League Baseball player for the Kansas City Royals (freshman only)
Anok Yai (b. 1997), fashion model
Raymond S. Burton, longest serving member of the Executive Council of New Hampshire in state history.
 Daniel M. French, Secretary of the Vermont Agency of Education (2014 Ed.D.).

Faculty
Karl Drerup (1904–2000), professor of fine arts from 1948 to 1968; namesake of university's art gallery
Robert Frost (1874–1963), American poet; taught at Plymouth Normal School in 1911
Elliot S. Maggin, (b. 1950), professor of English and American writer of comic books, film, television, and novels
Joseph Monninger (b. 1953), professor of English and writer of fiction and non-fiction

References

External links 

 https://plymouthstate.prestosports.com/information/Retired_Numbers/Jean-Pierre 
 https://littleeast.com/hof.aspx?hof=50  
 http://fs.ncaa.org/Docs/stats/m_basketball_RB/2011/D3.pdf 
 https://cathedralhighschool.net/news-stories/cathedral-high-inducts-five-into-athletics-hall-of-fame/

 
Educational institutions established in 1871
Land-grant universities and colleges
Public universities and colleges in New Hampshire
University System of New Hampshire
Universities and colleges in Grafton County, New Hampshire
1871 establishments in New Hampshire
Plymouth, New Hampshire
New England Hockey Conference teams